Herman Chernoff (born July 1, 1923) is an American applied mathematician, statistician and physicist. He was formerly a professor at University of Illinois Urbana–Champaign, Stanford, and MIT, currently emeritus at Harvard University.

Early life and education
Herman Chernoff's parents were Pauline and Max Chernoff, Jewish immigrants from Russia. He studied at Townsend Harris High School and earned a B.S. in mathematics from the City College of New York in 1943. He attended graduate school at Brown University, earning an M.Sc. in applied mathematics in 1945, and a Ph.D. in applied mathematics in 1948 under the supervision of Abraham Wald.

Recognition
Chernoff became a fellow of the American Academy of Arts and Sciences in 1974, and was elected to the National Academy of Sciences in 1980. In 1987 he was selected for the Wilks Memorial Award by the American Statistical Association, and in 2012 he was made an inaugural fellow of the American Mathematical Society.

See also
Chernoff bound (also known as Chernoff's inequality)
Chernoff face
Chernoff's distribution

References

External links
Chernoff's faculty profile at Harvard.
 Chernoff's faculty profile at MIT.
 Chernoff's biography on the MacTutor History of Mathematics archive.
 Chernoff's author profile on MathSciNet.
 Chernoff's profile on Mathematics Genealogy.
 Chernoff's author profile on Google Scholar.

1923 births
Members of the United States National Academy of Sciences
Living people
20th-century American mathematicians
21st-century American mathematicians
American statisticians
21st-century American physicists
Harvard University faculty
Presidents of the Institute of Mathematical Statistics
Fellows of the American Statistical Association
Brown University alumni
Fellows of the American Mathematical Society
Jewish American scientists
Townsend Harris High School alumni
Mathematicians from New York (state)
21st-century American Jews
Mathematical statisticians